The Pennsylvania Evening Post was the first daily newspaper published in the United States, and was produced by Benjamin Towne from 1775 to 1783. It was also the first newspaper to publish the United States Declaration of Independence.

History
Benjamin Towne published the first issue of the Post on January 24, 1775, using paper borrowed from James Humphreys without expectation of payment. The paper was supportive of the cause of the American Revolution, and was the first to publish the United States Declaration of Independence, with it taking up the front page of the July 6, 1776 issue.

Towne initially published his newspaper three times per week on Tuesday, Thursday and Saturday evenings "on half a sheet of crownpaper, in quarto." The cost to readers was "two pennies each paper, or three Shillings the quarter." His printing business was located on Front Street near the London Coffee House in Philadelphia.

During the British occupation of Philadelphia in 1778, the paper's ideology shifted towards loyalism. Other loyalist papers in the city, such as Humphrey's Pennsylvania Ledger, ceased publication as the British were losing control of Philadelphia; Towne stayed. As a result of his loyalist publication, the Supreme Executive Council of the Commonwealth of Pennsylvania placed him on a list of traitors. Towne's Post was selected to publish this list of traitors, possibly because other printers had not returned to the city.

In 1779, the Post published a series of articles written by Whitehead Humphreys, under the pseudonym "Cato." Humphreys's articles attacked the Pennsylvania Constitution of 1776 and accused Thomas Paine of being a loyalist. On July 24, supporters of the Constitutional Society, led by Charles Wilson Peale, dragged Towne to a meeting and demanded the identity of Cato. Towne named Humphreys, and the mob attacked Humphreys's house.

These controversies lead to a decrease in revenue. In 1780, Towne began advertising for hawkers. The paper started daily publication in spring of 1783, the first in the country to do so. The paper would continue publication in this format until 1784; reportedly, near the end of its run, Towne personally hawked the paper.

In June 2013, David Rubenstein, the chief executive officer of The Carlyle Group purchased a copy of the first newspaper printing of the U.S. Declaration of Independence for $632,500 during an auction at the Robert A. Siegel Galleries in New York. At the time, it was the highest price ever paid at auction for a historic newspaper, according to Reuters. Rubenstein subsequently loaned his copy of the newspaper to the Newseum in Washington, D.C. for its exhibit, "1776—Breaking News: Independence," which opened on July 1, 2016.

See also
 Physical history of the United States Declaration of Independence
 Early American publishers and printers

References

External links
"Declaration. The Pennsylvania Evening Post. Philadelphia: Benjamin Towne, 6 July 1776. (KF4506 .A1 1776a)," in "Dublin Core." Charlottesville, Virginia: The University of Virginia Library, retrieved online December 3, 2022. 
"Declaration of Independence and 1776" (video of David Rubenstein discussing the Newseum exhibit, "1776 - Breaking News: Independence"). Washington, D.C.: C-SPAN, July 7, 2016.
Pennsylvania Evening Post Archives. Journal of the American Revolution, retrieved online December 3, 2022.
The Pennsylvania Evening Post (Philadelphia, Pa.) 1775-1781 (overview and collections information). Washington, D.C.: Library of Congress, retrieved online December 3, 2022.
The Pennsylvania Evening Post, and Daily Advertiser. Philadelphia, Pennsylvania: Historical Society of Pennsylvania, retrieved online December 3, 2022. 
The Pennsylvania Evening Post, Philadelphia, PA, 1776 August 24. Mount Vernon, Virginia: Fred W. Smith National Library for the Study of George Washington, retrieved online December 4, 2022.
The Pennsylvania Evening Post, Saturday, July 6, 1776. New York, New York: The New York Public Library Digital Collections, retrieved online December 3, 2022.
To Alexander Hamilton from The Pennsylvania Evening Post, 25 January 1777, in "Founders Online." Washington, D.C.: National Archives, retrieved online December 3, 2022.
Towne, Benjamin (d. 1793) The Pennsylvania Evening Post, Vol. 1, No. 14, December 14, 1775. New York, New York: The Gilder Lehrman Institute of American History, retrieved online December 3, 2022.

Defunct newspapers published in Pennsylvania
United States Declaration of Independence
Publications established in 1775
1775 establishments in Pennsylvania
Publications disestablished in 1784
1784 disestablishments in the United States